{{Infobox football club
| club name = St. Louis City SC
| image = St. Louis City SC logo.svg
| upright = 0.75
| fullname = St. Louis City Soccer Club
| nickname = '| founded = 
| stadium = CityparkSt. Louis, Missouri
| capacity = 22,500
| own title = Owners
| owner = Carolyn KindleJo Ann Taylor KindleJim Kavanaugh
| chairman = Carolyn Kindle
| manager = Lutz Pfannenstiel
| mgrtitle = Sporting director
| coach = Bradley Carnell
| league = Major League Soccer
| season = 2023
| position = 
| current = 2023 St. Louis City SC season
| website = https://www.stlcitysc.com/
| American = true
| kit_alt1 = 
| pattern_la1 = _stl23h
| pattern_b1 = _stl23h
| pattern_ra1 = _stl23h
| pattern_sh1 = _adidasshortnavy
| pattern_so1 = _3_stripes_navy
| leftarm1 = de033c
| body1 = de033c
| rightarm1 = de033c
| shorts1 = de033c
| socks1 = de033c
| kit_alt2 = 
| pattern_la2 = _stl23a
| pattern_b2 = _stl23a
| pattern_ra2 = _stl23a
| pattern_sh2 = _adidasshortnavy
| pattern_so2 = _3_stripes_navy
| leftarm2 = c0c0c0
| body2 = c0c0c0
| rightarm2 = c0c0c0
| shorts2 = c0c0c0
| socks2 = c0c0c0

}}St. Louis City SC (stylized as St. Louis CITY SC') is an American professional men's soccer club based in St. Louis, Missouri. They compete in Major League Soccer (MLS) as a member of the Western Conference and joined in 2023 as an expansion team. The club was established in 2019 and plays its home matches at the Citypark, a new soccer-specific stadium next to Union Station in Downtown St. Louis.

History

Previous attempts

Soccer has had an established history at both the professional and amateur levels in Greater St. Louis for more than a century. In 2007, St. Louis was considered a possible destination for Real Salt Lake after the club founder announced he would sell the club if a new stadium was not built. From 2008 to 2009, St. Louis lawyer Jeff Cooper led a group of would-be owners who attempted to bring an MLS expansion team to Greater St. Louis, only to have the bids turned down in favor of other cities. Despite approved plans to build the $600 million Collinsville Soccer Complex, MLS was unimpressed with the bid's financial backing and suggested Cooper expand his group of investors. Cooper instead launched a second division men's club and a Women's Professional Soccer franchise. AC St. Louis played only one season in Division 2 before folding in 2011; the Saint Louis Athletica folded midway through its second season in 2010.

In late 2014, the city announced plans for a new stadium to host both American football and soccer. MLS Commissioner Don Garber said in January 2015, "St. Louis has got a lot of activity going on with a stadium that they’re trying to get done for the NFL's Rams. There's a big soccer community out there and we'd love to see a soccer stadium downtown like they're thinking about a football stadium." In May 2015, Garber visited St. Louis to talk about a possible new multi-purpose stadium that could host soccer games. Garber cautioned that any possible expansion to St. Louis would occur after 2020. On January 12, 2016, the Rams moved to Los Angeles after playing in St. Louis for 21 seasons. The Rams' move initially accelerated the talks of an MLS expansion team.

In 2017, MLS began to consider adding a team in St. Louis, beginning in 2020. The proposed ownership group sought public funds to help build a $200 million soccer-specific stadium next to Union Station in downtown St. Louis. On January 26, 2017, a funding plan was approved by the city's Aldermanic Ways and Means Committee, and later by the entire Board of Aldermen, that would have directed $60 million in city tax revenue to the new stadium. Voters rejected the plan in an April 4, 2017, referendum, leaving the city's MLS future in doubt.

2018–2019: Expansion bid
In September 2018, the St. Louis Post-Dispatch'' reported on a meeting between officials with the Missouri Department of Economic Development and MLS representatives regarding a stadium proposal; St. Louis Mayor Lyda Krewson later confirmed that a new group was trying to bring a team to St. Louis. St. Louis's MLS bid was effectively re-launched on October 9 of that year, with Carolyn Kindle and other heirs to the Enterprise Rent-A-Car fortune as the primary investors. The stadium location remained the same as in the original 2016 location, near Union Station. This bid did not seek public funding through taxes or from the city, so the public did not get to vote on the stadium. On November 28, 2018, the Board of Aldermen's Housing, Urban Development, and Zoning Committee voted 8–0 to approve the stadium plan.

On April 18, 2019, the MLS announced plans to expand to 30 teams, up from the previous plan of 28. The league, currently at 27 teams, advised the Commissioner's office to advance the discussions with the Sacramento Republic and St. Louis bids. Both bids were asked to make presentations to the MLS Expansion Committee to "address each bid's final stadium plan, corporate commitments, the composition of the respective ownership groups, detailed economics on funding, strategic plans for fan development, commitments on player development and details on community programs."

On April 20, 2019, two days after MLS announced it would advance discussions with the Sacramento and St. Louis bids, the St. Louis group released renderings and more information about their proposed stadium. The 22,500-seat stadium's design was produced by a collaboration between HOK and Snow Kreilich Architects. The group also promised that every seat would be within 120 feet of the field and that a canopy would cover the stadium.

On August 20, 2019, MLS announced it had approved St. Louis as the league's 28th franchise, with play expected to begin in the 2022 season. The ownership group consists of Enterprise Holdings Foundation president Carolyn Kindle Betz and female members of the Taylor family, and is the first female majority-owned team in MLS. In the announcement, Don Garber said, "St. Louis is a city with a rich soccer tradition, and it is a market we have considered since the league's inception. Our league becomes stronger today with the addition of the city's deeply dedicated soccer fans, and the committed and innovative local ownership group led by Carolyn Kindle Betz, the Taylor family, and Jim Kavanaugh."

2019–present
On October 19, 2019, the ownership group released new plans for the planned soccer-specific stadium. The area was extended to encompass a  plan and would likely exceed the original $200 million cost estimate. The ownership group agreed to purchase and own the land along with the stadium and will not seek tax revenue or public financing.

On December 17, 2019, the state of Missouri informed the ownership group that the $30 million previously promised by the state will no longer be provided. However, on March 18, 2020, the Missouri Development Finance Board unanimously approved a package of incentives worth $5.7 million in tax credits to help with construction of the $458 million stadium and surrounding area.

On March 25, 2020, the ownership group released a statement regarding the COVID-19 pandemic. Site preparation for the stadium will continue as planned. Site preparation includes clearing all land where the stadium will sit and demolishing the old on and off ramps located on the site.

Former South African International and New York Red Bulls assistant coach Bradley Carnell was named as the teams first head coach on January 5, 2022.

On February 25, 2023, St. Louis City SC played in and won their first match in Major League Soccer by a score of 3–2, against Austin FC at Q2 Stadium in Austin, Texas.

On March 4, 2023, St. Louis City SC played first home game and won first home game in Major League Soccer by a score of 3–1, against Charlotte FC at Citypark in St. Louis, Missouri.

Colors and badge
The crest features the iconic Gateway Arch and the two lines symbolize the confluence of the region's two rivers (Mississippi River and Missouri River). Officially, the team's colors are city red, river blue, energy yellow, and arch steel gray. The shade of red, which is the predominant color of the club, is magenta.

Sponsorship

On March 31, 2021, Purina, a pet food maker founded and based in St. Louis, became the club's first jersey sponsor and founding partner.
On July 14, 2021, Together Credit Union, a local credit union, became the club's second founding partner and the official banking partner.

Stadium 

The team plays in Citypark in downtown St. Louis that is the anchor of a  development area that includes team offices, training facilities, and commercial districts. The stadium is intended to field 17 to 23 soccer games a year and serve as a venue for concerts, high school sports, and more. The design of the stadium is intended to connect the surrounding area and the downtown area together while blending with the neighborhood.

Ownership and management 
The St. Louis City SC ownership group consists of Enterprise Holdings Foundation president Carolyn Kindle and female members of the Taylor family (Enterprise Holdings), and is the first female majority-owned team in MLS. The group also includes CEO of World Wide Technology, Jim Kavanaugh and members of the Kavanaugh family.

Players and staff

Roster

Technical staff

Executive staff

Captains

Club culture

Supporters

The most prominent soccer supporters' group in the St Louis area is the St. Louligans. Their name references football hooliganism, the disruptive and disorderly behavior of soccer fans, though this type of phenomenon is not generally found among soccer fans in North America. The St. Louligans were founded in 2010 when several local soccer fan groups joined forces at AC St. Louis home games. They have provided strong support for a number of St. Louis area soccer teams, including AC St. Louis, Saint Louis Athletica, St. Louis Lions, and Illinois Piasa.

St. Louligans was the official supporters group for Saint Louis FC, a USL Championship side founded in 2014. Saint Louis FC worked closely with the St. Louligans to encourage their support. Notable contributions of the group include awarding a new fan each week with a ticket, and coordinating with the Coopers, supporters for Louisville City FC, to create the Kings' Cup rivalry competition between the two teams. Saint Louis FC folded in 2020.

The St. Louis chapter of The American Outlaws, the largest supporters' group for the United States men's and women's national soccer team, is one of the most active in the country with over 1,000 members, leading the nation in funds raised for the group's charitable arm, AO Impact.

Many new independent supporters' groups were organized in anticipation of the MLS squad's arrival, supporting City 2 throughout their 2022 campaign. These groups include Saint Louis CITY Punks, sporting denim vests and Punk rock vibes, as well as the No Nap City Ultras, a supporters' group of parents and their young children. 2022 also saw the arrival of a new drum corps and supporters' group, the Fleur de Noise, who will take up the role of drumming and leading chants for the supporters.

Rivalries 
Due to their home cities close proximity and historic regional rivalry, Sporting Kansas City and St. Louis City SC have begun to develop an early rivalry.

Team record

Year-by-year

Reserve team

On December 6, 2021, the club announced it would be fielding a reserve team in the new MLS Next Pro league, in the third tier of US Soccer. St. Louis City 2 began play in the 2022 season, despite the MLS side not beginning play until 2023.

See also 
Sports in St. Louis
Soccer in St. Louis

References

External links
 
 View of Stadium from the sky https://www.youtube.com/watch?v=vAwu7vSAON4

 
2019 establishments in Missouri
Association football clubs established in 2019
Soccer clubs in Missouri
Major League Soccer teams
MLS team
MLS team
Sports in Greater St. Louis
Proposed sports teams